Brown Island, Brown's Island, or Browns Island may refer to:

 Brown Island or Brown Atoll, the Japanese name for Enewetak Atoll
 Brown Island (Antarctica)
 Browns Island (New Zealand), a small volcano off the coast of Auckland
 Browns Island (California), a  wetland in the San Jaoquin-Sacramento Delta
 Brown Island (Massachusetts)
 Brown Island (New York), an island on the West Canada Creek
 Brown's Island, Virginia
 Brown Island (Washington)
 Browns Island (Washington), and island in the Columbia River, west of Wishram, Washington
 Browns Island (West Virginia), an island in the Ohio River